

Gaea
Gaea is one of the Elder Gods of Earth.

Gaia
Gaia, also known as the Guardian of the Universal Amalgamator, is a fictional superhero, depicted as possibly being a mutant or extraterrestrial. Created by Larry Hama, she first appeared in Generation X #37.

Not much is known about Gaia's origin besides her having spent thousands of years chained to the Universal Amalgamator at the end of Time, a device that would be used to merge all sentient consciousnesses into one being. Gaia was apparently the safeguard that was supposed to prevent the Amalgamator from being activated by malicious people. She even claimed that her entire galaxy was wiped out at one point for her refusing to activate the Amalgamator.

However, when M-Plate, the synthesis of Emplate and M, tried to have Synch use his power to tap into Gaia's and activate the Amalgamator, Everett refused. The Citadel of the Universal Amalgamator began to crumble around them and Generation X wanted to leave, but Synch went back, along with Penance, to save Gaia. Banshee thought him lost but Gaia knew of a secret portal that was hidden underneath the altar that she had been chained to and—coincidentally—led back near the academy. With the Amalagamator destroyed, Gaia was freed from her responsibility and ran off to live a life that was now her own.

When she was seen next, she had gotten into an accident with a sports car and had pink hair. The policeman who came to the wreck knew of the academy, and suggested that she be put into their hands. She lost some of her abilities to the Shadow King's telepathic shockwave, and stayed with Gen X, hoping to sort out that difficulty with their help.

Gaia formally enrolled in the Xavier's School for Gifted Youngsters, but left after a short time, saying that she wanted to experience Earth, not just learn about it.

It is unknown if Gaia was one of the 90–95% of mutants who lost their mutant powers on M-Day.

Gaia has been shown to have a degree of superhuman strength, limited invulnerability, telepathy, psychokinesis, and the ability to draw on an extra-dimensional source of matter and energy in order to create or reshape anything according to her will.  She is capable of warping reality to a limited degree, although she is largely inexperienced with this power and its use requires great concentration. Gaia also appears to be either extremely long lived or completely immortal as she stated that she visited Earth 600 years ago and still has the appearance of a teenage girl.

Michelle Gonzales
Michelle Gonzales is a supporting character of Spider-Man in Marvel Comics' main shared universe. She is a criminal defense lawyer and the hot-tempered sister of Peter's roommate Vin Gonzales. She temporarily is Peter's roommate while Vin serves time for his involvement in the Spider-Tracer Killings frame-up. When Michelle attempts to kick Peter out (who is actually the Chameleon in disguise) she is instead seduced by him and become infatuated with him. She is almost constantly angry, but is also a helpful and kind person, by trying hard to help her clients get their lives back on track. After pestering and bothering Peter tirelessly, she returned to her previous home in Chicago shortly after Vin's release.

Galacta
Galacta is a fictional character appearing in American comic books published by Marvel Comics. She is the daughter of Galactus.

Galactus

Galaxy Master

Gambit

Gamesmaster

Gammenon the Gatherer

Gamora

Ganymede

Ganymede is a fictional extraterrestrial superhero in the Marvel Comics Universe. Her first appearance was Silver Surfer (vol. 3) #80 (May 1993).

Ganymede is the last surviving member of a race of warrior women known as the Spinsterhood, a group which was formed with the sole purpose of destroying the cosmic being known as Tyrant. After a centuries long cryogenic sleep, she awakened to find Tyrant's servants kidnapping powerful cosmic entities in order to drain their powers for their master's own ends. Mistaking Silver Surfer for a minion of Tyrant, Ganymede attacked him and the two fought until Tyrant's minions ambushed and kidnapped them both.

Ganymede, along with Tyrant's other hostages, Silver Surfer, Terrax, Morg, Beta Ray Bill, Gladiator and Jack of Hearts escaped their imprisonment and attacked Tyrant together, only to fail miserably. Galactus arrived and ended the battle. After that, those involved went their separate ways except for Ganymede, who decided to stay with Jack of Hearts to help nurse him back to health after his selfless sacrifice that freed his fellow captives. Ganymede and Jack of Hearts had a few adventures together, wherein they struck up a romantic relationship.

Gardener

Gargantua

Gargoyle

Yuri Topolov

Isaac Christians

Garokk

Jeffrey Garrett

John Garrett

Gatecrasher

Gateway

Kulan Gath

Gauntlet

Inhuman
Gauntlet is a member of the Dark Riders, employed by Apocalypse, and is one of the Inhumans. He is fitted with a cybernetic gauntlet, high-powered weapons, and wears a mechanical device over one eye used for tracking and scoping out prey.

Gauntlet first appeared in X-Factor #65 and was created by Jim Lee, Chris Claremont and Whilce Portacio.

Gauntlet made an appearance in the X-Men: Evolution episode "Target X" voiced by Mark Gibbon.

Joseph Green

Gavel

Blackie Gaxton

Blackie Gaxton was a gangster to whom Bennett Brant owed a large gambling debt. He blackmailed Brant into getting his sister Betty to contact Doctor Octopus when he was released from prison in order to spring Gaxton from prison himself. When Spider-Man caught up with Gaxton and Octopus on his getaway ship, Gaxton accidentally shot Bennett during a struggle with Spider-Man. He was arrested again and supposedly returned to prison.

Blackie Gaxton in other media
Gaxton appears in The Spectacular Spider-Man voiced by Steve Blum. In the episode "Reinforcements", Blackie Gaxton is the manager and bookie in the Big Sky Lounge and was one of the men responsible for turning Mark Allan into Molten Man. Mark Allen was a gambling addict who regularly visited Blackie to place bets, but after a while, he started to owe a lot of money. Gaxton used this opportunity to work with The Big Man and Hammerhead and has Mark Allen pay off his debt by turning him into a guinea pig in their experiment. His bar was later destroyed in a fire started by Molten Man, during a fight with Spider-Man.

Gazelle

Geiger

Geist

Geist (Nikolaus Geist) was a supervillain in Marvel Comics. He was created by Archie Goodwin, and first appeared in Wolverine (vol. 2) #17 (November 1989).

Geist had been an adviser for Adolf Hitler during World War II, and gave Hitler ideas on how to run the concentration camps. To escape war crime punishment, he used German rocket scientists to help the OSS. He later participated in questionable CIA operations. During Wolverine (vol. 2) #17 and later issues, however, he was an adviser to President Caridad, of the fictional South American country Tierra Verde. Caridad wanted Geist to create a superhero and champion for Tierra Verde, much like Captain America. He was experimenting on humans with a special crop of cocaine, which drove the victims mad. His main guinea pig was Roughouse. Wolverine learned of this, and even though Roughouse had been his enemy, he helped him escape.

Wolverine cut off Geist's metal shell, leaving him to die. However, Tierra Verde allowed CIA agents to bring Geist out of the country allowing subsequent repairs. Soon after that, Magneto caught up with him and brought him into an abandoned house, exacting his revenge for the death of Magnus' wife and supposedly killing him off-panel.

Geist was a cyborg, but had no superpowers. Due to his advanced age he was encased in a metal shell simply to survive.

Geldoff

Gemini

Joshua Link

Android

Ecliptic Gemini

Thanos' Gemini

Genesis

Genis-Vell

Gentle

Ghan

Ghaur

Annie Ghazikhanian

Annie Ghazikhanian is a fictional nurse who worked with the X-Men. She first appeared in The Uncanny X-Men #411, and was created by Chuck Austen and Ron Garney.

When the X-Man Havok is found in a comatose state, she is assigned to his care. Despite Havok's only real reaction being an energetic appreciation of the sunlight, she develops romantic feelings towards him. When the X-Men discover he is still alive (as he was presumed dead), Cyclops, Alex's brother, comes to collect him. Annie and her son soon move in.

While Annie is a normal human, her son, Carter Ghazikhanian, is a mutant. Annie has some anti-mutant prejudices, but she tries getting over them. She developed a personal friendship with the X-Man Northstar, and kept secret his romantic feelings for Iceman. She is seen many times administering to wounded X-Men.

When Havok wakes from his coma he pursues a relationship with Annie, even after becoming engaged to Polaris. Havok later leaves Polaris at the wedding altar, further damaging the woman's already-shaky mental state. He and Annie have a romantic relationship (despite her occasional flirts with Iceman) until she leaves the mansion. She fears for her son's safety because of supervillain attacks upon the mansion.

Carter Ghazikhanian

Carter Ghazikhanian is a fictional mutant character in the Marvel Comics Universe. His first appearance was in The Uncanny X-Men #411, created by Chuck Austen and Ron Garney.

Carter is the son of Annie Ghazikhanian, the former nurse at the Xavier Institute. Since their move to the school, Carter struck up a friendship with the young aquatic mutant Sammy, alias the Squidboy. When Carter tries to help Alex Summers, the X-Man known as Havok, from his coma, something strange occurs which rendered Carter unconscious. His consciousness became ensnared by the essence of the evil counterpart of Havok from the Mutant X universe, but Carter and the real Alex were rescued by Professor X. After the rescue, the Professor indicates he wants to talk to Annie about Carter's father, whose identity has yet to be revealed.

Annie later took him away from the Xavier Institute when she found it a too dangerous place for him. During their exit from the facilities, the new Brotherhood of Evil Mutants led by the ex-Acolyte Exodus, attack the institute. One of the Brotherhood's many victims is Sammy. Carter telepathically detects Sammy's brutal death.

Also, while they leave, the astral projection of an undetermined person is shown next to Carter's face. Annie seems unaware of this projection. Carter's dialogue and expression at this time hint that he is under the control of this individual. The projection was later revealed by Austen as the intended return of Cassandra Nova, but on his departure from the books, the storyline was dropped.

Carter Ghazikhanian is a mutant who possesses both telepathic and telekinetic abilities. The full extent of Carter's powers, however, are still undetermined.

Other versions of Carter Ghazikhanian
In X-Men: The End Carter is depicted as a deeply traumatized child, possibly as a result of the deaths of both his mother and Havok. His powers have evolved to the point of being able to create solid psionic constructs, as he is seen playing in a castle he created. He is killed, along with most of the student body, when Skrulls invade the mansion.

Ghost

Ghost Girl

Ghost Girl is an alias used by multiple superheroes in the Marvel Universe.

Ghost Girl (Wendy Hunt)
Ghost Girl (Wendy Hunt) is a fictional superhero in the Marvel Universe. She first appeared in The Invaders #14 (March 1977) and was created by Roy Thomas and Frank Robbins as an homage to DC Comics' Phantom Lady. She is a member of the Crusaders, and possesses a belt which enables her to generate a holographic double of herself.

Ghost Girl ll (Lili Stephens)
Ghost Girl (Lili Stephens) is a fictional mutant superhero in the Marvel Universe. She was created by Steve Seagle & Scott Clark, and first appeared in Alpha Flight (vol. 2) #2.

Ghost Girl is a former member of the superhero team Alpha Flight. Department H call her a "Legacy" case, but it is never explained what that means.

She possesses the ability to "phase" or pass through solid matter by passing her atoms through the spaces between the atoms of the object through which she is moving. While intangible, she is invulnerable to physical attacks. She can also use her intangible body to create gateways through solid objects for others to use, which she finds ticklish.

Ghost Rider

Johnny Blaze

Danny Ketch

Alejandra Jones

Robbie Reyes

Ghost Rider 2099

Ghoul

Giant-Man

Hank Pym

Bill Foster

Raz Malhotra

Gibbon

Gibborim

Gideon

Giganto

Gigantus

Gilded Lily
Gilded Lily (Lillian von Loont) was featured in the series Alpha Flight. She was an alchemist of great talent and a student of Diablo. Lily was initially seen to be a woman in a golden mask, golden gloves, and a fur coat that covered her slender body to her feet. She had lived for an inordinate length of time, her makeup (on her mask) and hair were very much in the style of the 1920s, particularly that of Louise Brooks.

Gladiator

Melvin Potter

Kallark

Gladiatrix

Corvus Glaive

Glob

Joseph "Joe" Timms

Sumner Samuel Beckwith

Glob Herman

Glob Herman (Robert Herman) is a fictional mutant character, a supervillain and later superhero appearing in American comic books published by Marvel Comics. His first appearance was in New X-Men #117. Glob was created by Grant Morrison and Ethan Van Sciver.

The young mutant called Glob Herman has skin that is completely transparent and made up of bio-paraffin, or "living wax". Though he lives among other mutants, Glob Herman easily stands out. Herman is friends with Kid Omega, one of Professor X's top students.

Glob Herman enrolled into the Xavier Institute for Higher Learning after Professor X was publicly revealed to be a mutant. Herman joins the unsanctioned, teenage Omega Gang, led by Kid Omega, as they secretly take a hard line stance for mutant rights. With the Omega Gang, Herman attacks the humans who they thought had murdered Jumbo Carnation. He later participates in the slaughter of a group of U-Men. When the Omega Gang instigate a riot at the Xavier Institute, Herman has Redneck light him on fire. He then pursues a bus full of human civilians, chasing it at full speed down the highway. Cyclops, Xorn and Beast pursue. Beast saves the lives of two men in a sports car who cross Herman's way, which he turns into scrap metal without slowing down. When the chase nears a gas station with a cement mixer, the X-Men manage to surround Herman. They use the mixer to cover him with cement and the Beast uses water bottles from the station himself to put out Herman's fire. At that point, much of Herman's covering of bio-paraffin has burned away, and he is reduced to a skeleton with only a relative thin layer of wax. Later, Herman is seen, still covered in cement, being ferried back to the X-Mansion on a specialized truck. For his crimes, the X-Men send him to help the needy in Africa.

During the event of Schism, Glob Herman chose to join Wolverine and became a student at the Jean Grey School. During an expedition with some other students and Wolverine in the Savage Land, Glob Herman was upset by the teaching methods of Wolverine, and he was proposed by Sauron to leave the X-Men. This plan was interrupted by the time-traveling villain 'Dog Logan', Wolverine's brother, who tormented the students Glob had been in the Savage Land with. He left them behind to seemingly face death at the hands of Dog, instead they defeated the villain. Glob agreed to join the Hellfire Club and becomes a recruit of the new Club's School: the Hellfire Academy.

Glob is back on friendly terms with his X-Academy teammates. He is allowed to rejoin as a student. As part of a remedial class he travels to New York with Spider-Man. There he's turned into a dinosaur and recovers. The entire class is kidnapped by Mojo, an inter dimensional villain. He is seen socializing with Kid Gladiator, Broo and Idie at a black-tie affair party. As part of the self-proclaimed 'special class', Glob Herman now goes on weekly crime fighting patrols with Spider-Man.

Herman is later seen volunteering to assist mutants and their family members in need at the school. Glob graduates to official X-Men status during his efforts to fight off a demonic invasion threatening innocent civilians. As part of the X-Men, he is on a squad sent after six hundred mutant embryos. This team and the embryos themselves are sent into the far future, in a world dominated by the villain Apocalypse. Glob, Anole, Ernst and No-Girl become lost in this far-future and as a four-some travel for a full year among many dangers before other X-Men show up to bring them home.

On an alternate universe, Glob, Beak and Quentin Quire were part of a villainous trio. As most of the heroes had been killed, villains ran rampant. Glob talked about his enjoyment of burning people before his entire group was taken down by that world's Nighthawk.

Glob Herman in other media
Glob Herman appears in X-Men: The Last Stand, portrayed by Clayton Dean Watmough. This version is a member of the Omegas, who join forces with the Brotherhood of Mutants to oppose a mutant cure.

Glorian

Glow Worm
Glowworm is the name of two unrelated fictional characters appearing in American comic books published by Marvel Comics. Though created only a few months apart, they have little in common except the name.

William Blake

First appeared in Power Man and Iron Fist #123 (May 1986). This Glowworm was William Blake, a former soldier who had volunteered for experiments to re-create the Super-Soldier Serum. After leaving the Marine Corps, one night he transformed into a huge, glowing white creature who began screaming racial slurs and attacking black people in Power Man's neighborhood. When news got out that a "white mutant" was attacking blacks, it nearly sparked a race riot, but once Cage defeated the creature, it reverted to human form, revealing that he was a black man himself. Blake had grown up in the Deep South, at a time when rampant racism led him to believe that blacks were inferior to whites, resulting in his own hatred of himself and his own race.

It has been revealed that Glowworm has remained in custody since his initial capture.

Glow Worm

The second Glowworm first appeared in X-Factor #7 (August 1986). This Glowworm is a mutant with a humanoid torso, and a worm-like tail instead of legs. He is the partner of Bulk, a mutant with enormous size and strength.

Bulk and Glowworm were outcasts, not just for their mutant status or unusual appearance, but because both continually gave off toxic levels of hard radiation. The two sought shelter in a toxic waste dump in New Jersey, but upon hearing about the group X-Factor (who at that time were posing as mutant hunters), the pair decided to attack them to "protect mutants". After a short battle, the members of X-Factor explained their true nature as mutants themselves. The two returned to their isolation.

In The New Mutants Annual #4, Bulk and Glowworm seemingly sacrificed their lives to save Danielle Moonstar.

Glyph
Glyph (Nadeen Hassan) is a teenager that became a beacon that summoned ancient Egyptian spirits. She was ultimately recruited into the Howling Commandos.

Ma Gnucci

GoGo Tomago

Goblyn
Goblyn (Goblyn Dean) is a fictional mutant character in the Marvel Comics universe. She first appeared in Alpha Flight #48 (July 1987), and was created by Bill Mantlo and Terry Shoemaker.

Goblyn is one of a pair of fraternal twins. Before birth, it was revealed that Goblyn was a mutant and would be of monstrous appearance. Her parents decided that for her own good she would be aborted. Sensing the danger, her sister Laura (later known as Pathway) used her own mutant ability to send Goblyn to another dimension where she would be safe. Later Laura would return her to Earth, where they would both become involved with Alpha Flight.

Goddess

Godzilla

Golddigger

Golden Archer

Golden Archer (Wyatt McDonald) is a fictional superhero appearing in American comic books published by Marvel Comics. The character was created by Roy Thomas and John Buscema and first appeared in The Avengers #85 (February 1971). He is a member of the Squadron Supreme. He has also gone by the codenames Hawkeye and Black Archer.

Wyatt McDonald, an Australian cab driver in his civilian guise, was a master archer with a large selection of specialized trick arrows. He originally began his career as a masked superhero under the identity of Hawkeye. He developed a relationship with Linda Lewis (a.k.a. Lady Lark), a former vocalist whose vocal cords had been altered by the criminal mastermind Dr. Decibel. Together they fought crime in the city of New Babylon, eventually gaining enough fame to draw the attention of the superhero group Squadron Supreme, who invited them to join.

The character first appeared when Avengers Vision, Scarlet Witch, Quicksilver, and Goliath (Clint Barton) end up in the Squadron Supreme's universe and briefly battle them.

Alongside the Squadron, he falls under the influence of the Serpent Cartel. The team travels to the mainstream Marvel Universe and battles the Avengers. As there is already a Hawkeye in that universe, McDonald changes his name to the Golden Archer to "avoid confusion", picking a name that the Avenger Hawkeye had once used as an alias. The Avengers eventually convince the Squadron that the Serpent Cartel is evil, and the team denounces them.

Alongside the Squadron, he is mind-controlled by the Overmind. The team is freed by the Defenders, and the two teams battle the Overmind and Null, the Living Darkness. To repair the global chaos wrought by the Overmind, the Golden Archer joins in the Squadron's decision to take control of the United States to implement the Utopia Program, and with the rest of the team publicly reveals his secret identity. Wyatt was captured, and nearly executed by vigilantes.

McDonald's relationship with Lady Lark becomes strained as she develops romantic feelings for fellow Squadron member Blue Eagle. McDonald proposes to Linda, but she rejects him. Desperate to maintain their relationship, he uses a behavior-modifying machine (created to reform criminals) to make her love him, completely changing her personality in the process.

He is soon captured by the Squadron's enemies, the Institute of Evil. The Institute tortures the Archer into revealing the location of the Squadron's new base of operations, and attack and capture the Squadron. They use the behavior modification device on the heroes to make them be on their side, but it is revealed that after the Archer had used the machine on Lady Lark, the machine had been modified so it could not affect other Squadron members. The Golden Archer later admits what he did to Lady Lark, and the team votes to expel him. He later changes his name to the Black Archer and joins the Redeemers, a team founded by Nighthawk to oppose the Squadron's domination of the planet. The teams eventually battle each other, and Black Archer is killed by a blow from Blue Eagle.

The Golden Archer has no superhuman powers, but he is a superb archer. He uses a customized double-recurve bow, with both conventional arrows and a wide variety of "trick arrows". He is a good hand-to-hand combatant, trained by Nighthawk. He also wore a protective force field belt, as a Squadron member, designed by Tom Thumb.

Supreme Power Golden Archer
An African-American superhero called Black Archer appears in the Supreme Power: Hyperion miniseries, set in a possible future of the Supreme Power universe.

Heroes Reborn Golden Archer
In the 2021 "Heroes Reborn" reality, Golden Archer is a member of the Secret Squadron. During the fight with Siege Society, Golden Archer had a duel with Hawkeye before being stepped on by an enlarged Fire Ant. Following the fight with the Siege Society, Tom Thumb, Nighthawk, and Blur mourn the deaths of Amphibian, Arcanna Jones, Blue Eagle, and Golden Archer.

Hawkeye Hawkeye uses the alias when Steve Rogers gives up the Captain America persona to try and make Steve realize he can't give up being a hero; it works and Steve takes up the Nomad persona

Golden Girl
Golden Girl is the name of two superhero characters:

Betsy Ross

Gwenny Lou Sabuki

Golden Woman

Golem

Goliath

Bill Foster

Tom Foster

Vin Gonzales

Goom

Gordon

Gordon is a fictional character that originated in the Marvel Cinematic Universe before appearing in Marvel comics. The character, created by Jeffrey Bell, Jed Whedon and Maurissa Tancharoen, first appeared in "What They Become" of Agents of S.H.I.E.L.D. (December 9, 2014) and is portrayed by Jamie Harris.

Comics
Gordon made his comic book debut in Uncanny Inhumans #0 (June 2015) from Ryan Stegman and Ryan Lee. Gordon was imprisoned in another dimension with the monstrous Inhuman named Snarkle. Both were exiled by the Great King Kalden 2,000 years ago for unknown reasons. In modern-day New Attilan, two young Inhumans named Flint and Iso activate a portal to this other dimension. Snarkle enters their dimension with the intent of having their revenge, but Gordon chooses to stay declaring "Goodbye Snarkle. I never liked you", leaving Snarkle to be comically defeated by the younger Inhumans.

Gorgilla

Gorgolla

Gorgon

Inhuman

Tomi Shishido

Delphyne Gorgon

Gorilla Girl

Gorilla-Man

Ken Hale

Dr. Arthur Nagan

Franz Radzik

Gorr the God Butcher

Gorr the Golden Gorilla

Gosamyr
Gosamyr is a fictional character, a supervillain turned superhero appearing in American comic books published by Marvel Comics. The character first appeared in The New Mutants #66 (August 1988), and was created by Louise Simonson and Bret Blevins.

Simonson said she was considering having Gosamyr reform and join the New Mutants, depending on how much Simonson liked her. Gosamyr was written out of the series with The New Mutants #74.

Gosamyr is a member of a rare, ancient race of alien beings. In line with her heritage, Gosamyr is a very beautiful and delicate humanoid creature in her early stage. Once they reach adulthood, members of her race cocoon themselves for several thousand years before finally emerging as large powerful monstrosities. If released too early they can be powerful enough to destroy planets, even solar systems. The females of the species also have empathic powers which, even without intent, can cause conflict between even the closest of friends to the point of destruction. Provoking such conflict has evolved into the cultural norm for the species as a means of vying for dominance. As part of this, Gosamyr used her beauty to seduce male humans. She even tries to chat up eight-year-old Jack Power, who resents her approaches.

Through some bad business dealings by her brother, Gosamyr and her family are forfeited to the evil alien businessman Spyder. Spyder keeps most of Gosamyr's family imprisoned while she herself is kept at the end of a leash as a pet.

Through similar arrangements, Spyder had also acquired "property rights" over Lila Cheney. Lila is kidnapped by Spyder's men in spite of the efforts of her friends from the New Mutants. While in Earth's orbit, Gosamyr gives Spyder the slip, steals a space yacht and goes to Earth to find the New Mutants and ask for their help to save both her family and Lila.

Gosamyr and the New Mutants follow Spyder to a planet where greed and the search for profit is the norm. On their space voyage, Gosamyr manipulates the New Mutants and causes conflict between them in order to establish herself as the alpha female of the group. Only Warlock, being a Technarch, is immune to her manipulations and suspects that Gosamyr is a threat before it is too late, and her manipulations have exposed Rahne's repressed feelings for Lila's boyfriend Cannonball, caused Magik to lose control of her demonic essence, and brought the New Mutants to blows with each other. Magik breaks the spell by striking Gosamyr with her Soulsword. Now with Gosamyr as their prisoner, the New Mutants break into Spyder's palace to rescue Lila, but are captured by Spyder, who has been monitoring their progress and using Gosamyr's nature to lead them into a trap.

Gosamyr frees the New Mutants by using a trick which makes her invisible. They then discover that Gosamyr's family are in their cocoon stage and Spyder intends to force them out and kill them to use their bodies to make valuable textiles. Exiting their cocoons long before their time, the creatures grow with every passing minute and threaten to destroy the planet and its solar system. To prevent this, Lila apparently teleports them and herself into the Sun. Now orphaned, Gosamyr nonetheless accepts that Lila's killing her family was necessary.

Magik then uses her own teleportation powers to get the New Mutants and Gosamyr away from the planet and into Limbo, only to find themselves trapped there. Gosamyr remains on the fringes, using her emphatic power to keep the demons away from her. She no longer actively manipulates her companions, and though Warlock remains suspicious of her, New Mutants co-leader Mirage has forgiven her earlier misdeeds.

Gosamyr helps out clearing the damage after a demonic invasion of Manhattan. She uses her powers to help relieve the pain of male patients in a local hospital. More controversially, she helps the kids from Power Pack reconcile with their parents who, in the course of fighting an enemy, discovered that their children had super-powers which they had kept secret from them. The parents suffered a nervous breakdown as a result, but Gosamyr convinces them that their children are still normal. (This "cover-up" was highly criticized in the readers' letters column.)

Gosamyr and her companions decide to take up residence in the spacecraft Ship, the ally and mobile headquarters of X-Factor. Upon scanning Gosamyr, Ship recognizes her species and tries to kill her. Though the New Mutants fight Ship to a standstill in her defense, the incident convinces Gosamyr that her nature makes her too much of a danger to the New Mutants and their friends. Ship informs her of a planet of mystics who might be able to teach her to curb her nature and provides her with a spacecraft with which to go there. Resolved to not cause any more harm to her friends, Gosamyr takes Ship's suggestion and leaves Earth.

While in the larval stage, Gosamyr possesses wings that allow her to glide over short distances. She can also become invisible once she wraps herself in them. She also possesses some empathic control over males, which she mostly uses to seduce or bring about conflict.

The pupal stage of Gosamyr's species lasts for millennia, during which they become exceptionally mature of spirit and gain great size and strength, enough to destroy a whole solar system. In adult form they are gentle and solitary.

Grand Director

Grandmaster

Glory Grant

Grasshopper

Doug Taggert

Neil Shelton

Unnamed

Skrull

Mort Graves

Graviton

Gravity

Graymalkin

Great Gambonnos
Ernesto and Luigi Gambonno were born in Milan, Italy. They are acrobats and aerialists working for the criminal organization, the Circus of Crime. They are identical twins and though they perceive themselves as the "Kings of the High Trapeze", they are defeated pretty easily by Spider-Man and Daredevil who prove to be superior acrobats to the both of them.

Green Goblin

Norman Osborn

Harry Osborn

Dr. Bart Hamilton

Phil Urich

Construct

Grendel
Grendel, also known as the Symbiote Dragon, is a character appearing in American comic books for Marvel Comics. The character first appeared in Venom vol. 4 #1 (May 2018), and was created by Donny Cates and Ryan Stegman.

Symbiote Dragon
Grendel is a symbiote created by Knull billions of years in the past, sent out into the cosmos alongside its brethren to destroy and devour everything they came across. Arriving on Earth in the 6th century, it was subdued by Thor and imprisoned in a glacier, where it's exhumed by S.H.I.E.L.D. centuries later. Lying dormant for several decades, Grendel is indwelled by Knull and rampaged through New York, but is ultimately defeated by Eddie Brock / Venom.

Grendel in other media
A variation of Grendel called the Kyntar Dragon appears in the Spider-Man series finale "Maximum Venom".

Tyrannosaurus
Tyrannosaurus is the first offshoot of the Grendel symbiote thanks to S.H.I.E.L.D. and bonded to soldiers in the Vietnam War as a black-ops super-soldier initiative. Tyrannosaurus was bonded to Rex Strickland; it initally seized control of its host which it tried to corrupt before gradually being touched by Rex's compassion, nobility and goodness, and tried to shield Rex from an explosion but failed. Feeling guilty, Tyrannosaurus emulated its host's appearance/identity and personality for decades. Tyrannosaurus worked with Brock and helped Venom against Knull and Gendrel, revealing its true form and amalgamating itself with its ally before sacrificing itself in an attempt to immolate the superior symbiotes.

Dark Carnage
Carnage, also known as Dark Carnage, is another offshoot of the Grendel symbiote. It initally bonded with the damaged form of Cletus Kasady / Carnage due a cult worshiping symbiote using Grendel's remnants which was stolen from the Maker. He consumed the various symbiotes for his own cult, such as Lee Price / Maniac which is the Mania symbiote's host. His form as Dark Carnage is a thirteen-foot-tall skeletal monster with Knull's spiral on its forehead and a white dragon/spider emblem on his chest, and effectively is a demigod possessing power far beyond what a regular symbiote bestows its host, due to his connections to Chthon through the curse of the Darkhold and Knull through Grendel. Dark Carnage fights Peter Parker / Spider-Man and Brock, but is suprised by the Hulk. Caught off-guard by Parker's various allies, Dark Carnage tried to use Dylan Brock and Normie Osborn as hostages before Brock cut Kasady's corpse in half which also reawakened Knull in the process. One of the splintered versions bonded to Miles Morales / Spider-Man as a unique six-armed symbiote.

Afterwards, Devil Carnage assimilated Venom while tormenting Eddie and Dylan before beind separated and defeated yet bonding to a great white shark to escape. 

Carnage bonded to a great white shark to escape from the Isla de Huesos, and prowled the ocean for several months as the "red king of darkness". Eventually it stumbled upon a boat full of whalers and seizing the opportunity, Carnage catches one of the whalers and bonds to him, climbs aboard and prepares to slaughter the crew, intent on taking its place as the Red Right Hand of the King in Black, however, Knull is killed by Brock which causes the symbiote dome encasing Earth to shatter into countless symbiotes. Through the symbiote hive-mind, Venom is the new god of the symbiotes and calls out to Carnage who snarls to get out of his head. As symbiotes rain from the sky onto the ship and into the ocean, they bond to the crew of the ship and state that they are Venom, leaving Carnage shocked and incredulous. Manifesting an arm-blade, Carnage snarls as Venom states that Knull is dead. As Carnage sinks back into the ocean, Eddie says Carnage is not welcome in the reformed Hive and sentences to execution. Countless symbiote-controlled sharks began swarming Carnage and devouring in a feeding frenzy until the symbiote completely disappears in the darkness of the ocean.

Following the confrontation with the new King in Black, a piece of the symbiote survived and chooses a fish for a host and then attacks a shark. It eventually moves up the food chain and arrives on a fishing boat and begins again a killing spree. Inspired by what Eddie had done, Carnage formulated a new plan to make a comeback using the power Knull had bequeathed it to create a rival Hive with itself as its nexus. Carnage slowly made its way back to New York - restoring itself by devouring everyone it came across en route. Once back in Manhattan, Carnage bonded to Senator Arthur Krane to run a campaign to get Earth rid of aliens, both the good and bad type, and is working with Alchemax and the Friends of Humanity. Carnage also began to infect many symbiotes, such as Phage, Lasher, Riot and Agony. Once all his soldiers were in place, Carnage killed on live television at one of his rallies and directed his Hive to slaughter as many attending civilians as possible, but was opposed by Flash Thompson, Silence, Toxin and Sleeper. Carnage assimilated Extrembiote - a symbiote-dragon mutated by Extremis - while abandoning Krane, transforming into a symbiote-dragon and flew away while using Agony as a loyal pawn.

Dark Carnage in other media
 Dark Carnage appears as an alternate skin for Cletus Kasady / Carnage in Marvel: Future Fight.

Grey Gargoyle

Jean Grey

John Grey

John Grey is a history professor and member of the extended "Grey Family" in the Marvel Universe.

The character, created by Stan Lee and Jack Kirby, first appeared in X-Men #5 (May 1964).

Within the context of the stories, John Grey is the father of Jean Grey and husband of Elaine Grey. He was portrayed as a history professor employed at Bard College in Annandale-on-Hudson, New York.

After the death of his daughter Sara, he and Elaine take in and care for their grandchildren, Gailyn and Joey Bailey.

During the "End of Greys" story arc, Doctor Grey is the first of his extended family to be killed by the Shi'ar Death Commandos.

Other versions of John Grey
X-Men: The End features an alternate future of the X-Men in which Doctor Grey is still alive.
In the Ultimate Marvel continuity Professor Grey appears in various issues of Ultimate X-Men and in Ultimate War #2. Within this continuity he and his wife place Jean into a mental institution at a young age as her telepathy manifests. In a later appearance it is stated that he can recognize the feeling of telepathic scanning.

John Grey in other media

Television
 John Grey makes a non-speaking cameo in X-Men: Evolution.
 John appears in Wolverine and the X-Men episodes as an old friend of Charles Xavier.

Film
 John Grey appears in the prologue of X-Men: The Last Stand played by Adrian Hough.
 He appears in Dark Phoenix played by Scott Shepherd. He witnesses first hand Jean's powers manifest when she accidentally kills Elaine in a car crash. While John survives, he becomes emotionally distraught and has Xavier take Jean away and have her believe that he died in the crash as well. Years later, she comes looking for him and becomes upset that he did nothing to find her. He is later visited by Vuk, posing as an FBI agent, and is killed by her.

Greystone
Devlin Greystone is a fictional Māori character in the Marvel Universe, who was part of the second incarnation of X-Factor. He was created by Howard Mackie, and first appeared in X-Factor #140 (December, 1997).

Greystone is from the same alternate future as Bishop, Archer, Fixx, and Shard. He is a member of the Xavier Underground Enforcers (XUE), a rogue branch of the Xavier's Security Enforcers (XSE) who wanted to travel back in time and change their future.

When he was a child, Greystone lived with his mother in a type of mutant concentration camp. As part of their punishment, each prisoner was required to have an "M" branded over their right eye to outwardly signify their status as a mutant. During his branding process by an evil man named Micah, Greystone panicked and - due to the large amount of stress - manifested his mutant power years before the traditional onset at puberty. This resulted in him breaking the machine (leaving him with only a partial brand), and trying to break out with his mother. Micah shot and killed her and was about to kill Greystone too if not for the incitement of the Summers Rebellion which ultimately led to mutant freedom. However, this was not as grand as it seemed, for Greystone became an orphan and a street urchin outside the confines of the camp.

Upon discovering that Shard was in the present, the X.U.E. managed to travel back in time due to the psionic link Fixx created between the members of the X.U.E. which Shard was also a member of, and inhabited the bodies of three recently deceased people. Greystone inhabited the body of the adolescent teen Brian Young.

While looking in the newspaper one day, Greystone happens to see the picture of a young boy named Micah. He immediately recognizes him as the same Micah who murdered his mother and concocts a plan to murder the child, thus averting his future and his mother's death. He, along with Fixx and Archer, track down the boy and Greystone tries to kill him. Archer and Fixx convince him that it is unethical to condemn the child for crimes he has not yet committed and the trio leaves. They had tried to change the future but instead ended up joining X-Factor.

Greystone slowly developed temporal insanity, believing that his mission was accomplished, and he could go home to a better world and be reunited with his mother, who might theoretically be alive. In an attempt to return to his own time, Greystone built a flying time machine, but due to shoddy craftmanship and unsound theories, the craft exploded, seemingly killing Greystone and Havok, who was attempting to stop him.

Greystone can increase his body mass, density, durability, stamina and strength exponentially but at a price: the bigger he gets, the more deformed and horrific-looking he becomes. Greystone can appear as his host body or in his original body—humorously a small, white child—also carrying the memories from both bodies.

Griffin

David Griffith

Grim Hunter

Grim Reaper

Grindhouse

Grizzly

Ace Fenton

A.I.M. operative

Maxwell Markham

Theodore Winchester

Grog

Groot

Grotesk

Grotesk is a fictional character in the Marvel Universe. He first appeared in X-Men #41-42 (February–March 1968), and was created by Roy Thomas and Don Heck.

The character subsequently appears in Ms. Marvel #6 (June 1977) and #8 (August 1977), The Avengers Annual #20 (1991), Avengers West Coast Annual #6 (1991), Iron Man Annual #12 (1991), and Thor #481 (December 1994).

Prince Gor-Tok, also known as Grotesk, is the former prince of a warlike, civilized race of Gortokian Subterraneans with human intelligence and virtually human appearance.  Underground atomic explosions created by surface humans led to the extinction of the entire race except for Grotesk, who, his mind and body first distorted by radiation, vows to destroy the entire surface world.

Grotesk encounters the heroic mutants the X-Men on his first foray to the surface world. He fights them, and kills the Changeling (who, at the time was posing as Professor X to the X-Men).

Grotesk later encounters Ms. Marvel. He also sides with the Mole Man and Tyrannus in their war against the surface world and the Avengers.

Grotto

Grotto is a fictional character appearing in Marvel comics. He was created by Frank Miller and first appeared in Daredevil #168.

Grotto is a small-time criminal and the frequent partner of Turk Barrett. Like Turk, he works for Eric Slaughter and the Kingpin, resulting in frequent encounters with Daredevil and at one point encountered Elektra. Although generally regarded as unintelligent, Grotto often tries to act as a voice of reason to Turk's aggressive and overconfident behavior such as refusing to escape prison so that they can fill out their time and return to the streets without problem. When the Kingpin returned to San Francisco, Grotto was rehired as one of his elite members.

Grotto in other media

 Grotto, legal name Elliot Grote, appears in the second season of Daredevil, portrayed by McCaleb Burnett. He is a low-ranking member of the Kitchen Irish mob, serving as a driver and occasional assassin for their leader Nesbitt. After Frank Castle attacks a Kitchen Irish meeting, of which Grotto is the sole survivor, Grotto flees to Josie's Bar, coincidentally while Matt Murdock, Karen Page and Foggy Nelson are there. Matt, tipped off by Grotto's adrenaline spike and observing that he's carrying a weapon, approaches Grotto, who in turn asks the Nelson & Murdock trio to get him witness protection. While Karen guards Grotto as he recovers in the hospital from a shrapnel wound he received in the shooting, Frank shows up and makes a second attempt to kill him, but Karen manages to get Grotto out of the hospital and to the 15th Precinct. With Matt recuperating from getting shot in the head by Frank during the attack, Karen and Foggy are left to negotiate a plea deal for Grotto with District Attorney Smanatha Reyes and Assistant District Attorney Blake Tower. As part of the deal, Grotto will give up an associate in the mafia named Edgar Brass in exchange for witness protection. However, Reyes double-crosses Nelson & Murdock, instead using Grotto as bait for Frank, with "Brass" actually being an ESU officer. A firefight breaks out and Grotto flees the scene. He later calls Karen from a payphone to unceremoniously fire the firm, despite Karen's efforts to apologize for Reyes' double-cross. He does not get far, as Frank captures him and takes him to a rooftop where he has already captured and chained up Matt. Frank gives Matt a gun, and the choice of killing either one of them. Matt shoots the chains securing him, but is unable to stop Frank from fatally shooting Grotto. Out of guilt, Matt, Karen and Foggy hold a private funeral for Grotto at Matt's church. In his eulogy, the most positive thing Father Lantom can say about Grotto is that he went to and donated to the church, and he explains to Matt afterwards that if they ignored his criminal past, there would be no learning from it.

Growing Man

The Growing Man is a fictional character appearing in American comic books published by Marvel Comics, first appearing in Thor #140 (May 1967); and reappearing in Avengers #69 (October 1969). The character was created by Stan Lee and Jack Kirby. After an appearance in Iron Man #108 (March 1978), the Growing Man is not seen in Marvel continuity until The Avengers #268 (June 1986), and then #300 (February 1989). After being found and used by new masters HYDRA in Thunderbolts #5 (August 1997), the android appeared in Young Avengers #3 (June 2005) and in upgraded form in Sentinel Squad O*N*E #2 (April 2006). The Growing Man later appeared in Avengers vs. Atlas #1 (January 2010).

The Growing Man is an android built by an enslaved alien race on the time-traveling villain Kang the Conqueror's behalf. First appearing on Earth as an inert doll-sized figure, the android is found by New York police, reactivating and causing havoc until coming into conflict with the Thunder God Thor. The Growing Man is then deactivated and recovered by Kang who is in turn defeated by Thor. Kang also uses the Growing Man to abduct Tony Stark (the alter-ego of Iron Man) from a hospital. The superhero Avengers team (including Thor) attack the Growing Man and follow the android into the future, where they're involved in a competition between Kang and the Elder of the Universe known as the Grandmaster. The alien colonizers of Rigel eventually find the Growing Man in one of Kang's abandoned vessels and send it back to Earth to use it against Iron Man who defeats the android by overloading its circuitry. The Growing Man reappears in the dimension of Limbo and attacks the Avenger Hercules who hit it so hard that it collapses as its cells are overtaxed. Eventually, it finds its way to Earth, where temporary member Mister Fantastic devises a means of reversing the growing process, causing the android to shrink from sight.

The Growing Man is found and reactivated by the subversive organization HYDRA. HYDRA's leader Baron Strucker orders the android to attack New York as part of a ploy to destroy the Thunderbolts team. The heroes manage to defeat the android by forcing it to grow large enough that the team could hack its circuitry and shut it down. However, this also activate a beacon in its circuitry that will warn the ancestors of the original aliens of Kang's coming. Kang uses another variation of the android when attempting to track his younger self, with this version splitting into several smaller versions once hit with sufficient force, but they all withdraw once the young Kang identifies himself. An upgraded form is sent by HYDRA to disrupt a political rally, but is stopped when its powers are overloaded.

Growing Man in other media
The Growing Man appears in the Avengers Assemble episode "The Thunderbolts", voiced by Travis Willingham. This version is a stimuloid that Justin Hammer modified with Stark Industries' stolen technology, though it was defeated by the Avengers and the Thunderbolts.

Guardian

Guardsman

Kevin O'Brien

Michael O'Brien

Others

Guillotine
Guillotine or Jeannine Sauvage is a fictional mystic character appearing in American comic books published by Marvel Comics. Guillotine has no superpowers but is an expert swordswoman and wields the mystic Fleur du Mal, a sword with dark supernatural powers (the sword name means literally "The Flower of Evil" in French). Born of a mixed French-Algerian heritage, she is the latest in her bloodline to inherit the sword. The character was conceived by writer Al Ewing and the full design was developed by Kabam art director Gabriel Frizzera and artist Paco Medina. She first appeared in the second volume of Contest of Champions released October 7, 2015 (cover dated December 2015).  Shortly after, she made her debut in the game Marvel: Contest of Champions. In 2017, Guillotine was briefly featured in the title U.S.Avengers.

In 1793, an ancestor of Sauvage, Jean Desmarais, found the mythical Fleur du Mal sword in the Paris catacombs when escaping the authorities for being a revolutionary. Since then, it was passed on to his descendants with the most recent one being Jeannine Sauvage. Jeannine discovered the sword at age twelve by being lured to a room that was usually locked by a voice. While inspecting the sword, she slit her finger with its edge, and the blood dripped into the sword. This caused Jeannine to become cursed to wield this sword like her ancestors before her. During the Secret Empire storyline, Guillotine appears as a member of the Champions of Europe alongside Ares, Captain Britain, Excalibur, Outlaw, and Peregrine. With help from Squirrel Girl and Enigma, the team manages to liberate Paris, France from Hydra occupation.

In other media
 Guillotine is a playable character in the online game Marvel: Contest of Champions. This marked the first time that a Marvel character appeared in comics that was developed for a game.

Jebediah Guthrie

Melody Guthrie
Melody Guthrie is the younger sister of Cannonball, Husk, and Icarus. Her father dies early in her life due to black lung. Melody is seen in multiple issues of the New Mutants, living at their Kentucky farm, as her brother Cannonball is a featured character in that series. Many stories focus on his home life.

Melody sees her siblings develop powers one by one. Her brother Sam is the first, followed by Paige (aka Husk). Husk comes to the attention of the alien entities known as the Phalanx; they come to the farm, endangering the lives of the entire family, kidnapping Paige, and destroying the family home. Much later Josh/Icarus manifests his wings during a music festival; the resulting chaos draws all the Guthries into a brutal feud with another family. Melody then develops the ability to produce an aura that allows her to fly. After this manifestation, she becomes known as Aero. She then joins Xavier's team as a student during a time when Cannonball is one of the supporting staff. At one point he rebukes her for showing off in front of a helicopter news crew.

Due to the effects of Scarlet Witch going insane in the Marvel crossover event "Decimation", a majority of Earth's mutants lose their powers. Aero and her brother Jeb both lost their powers following the events of M-Day. She doesn't quite understand how this affects her. In an attempt to prove to one of her teachers, Emma Frost, that she still has her powers, she leaps off of a roof; another teacher, Hank McCoy, managed to save her from injury.

Melody moves back home with her mother, Lucinda, and her other siblings. She later appears as an astral projection caused by Emma Frost during a confrontation with Ms. Marvel. She and her mother later receive a call from Emma Frost concerning the death of Melody's brother, Joshua, who was killed in an attack on Xavier's.

Melody was allowed to live in the newly created mutant-only nation of Krakoa because she was a former mutant and a member of the Guthrie family, known for their strong X-Gene. There, she became the first to undergo a novel ritual called the Crucible, a trial of combat against Apocalypse to earn the right to die and be resurrected by the Five, to regain her lost powers. In front of a large ensemble of mutants, she was brutalized by Apocalypse, who urged her to give up and ask to heal instead of persisting in the fight. Melody refused and was ultimately killed by Apocalypse, passing the trial of Crucible. She later claimed her prize when she was resurrected by the Five, with her former powers returned to her.

Henry Peter Gyrich

Gwenpool

References

Marvel Comics characters: G, List of